Stephanie "Morning Fire" Fielding (Mohegan: Yôpôwi Yoht) is a Mohegan linguist. Her work focuses on the resurrection and revitalization of the Mohegan language. During the 2017-2018 academic year, she was a Presidential Fellow and lecturer in the Department of Linguistics at Yale University. Fielding lives on the Mohegan reservation in southeastern Connecticut, in Uncasville.

Biography and career 
Fielding holds a Bachelor of Arts in linguistics and anthropology from the University of Connecticut, as well as a Master of Science in linguistics from the Massachusetts Institute of Technology (MIT). She was the first student to graduate from a two-year Masters program at MIT "for members of indigenous communities whose languages are dead or dying." Her Master's thesis, The Phonology of Mohegan-Pequot, includes diary excerpts written in Mohegan from her relative Fidelia Fielding, the last fluent speaker of the Mohegan language. Much of Fielding's graduate work focused on linguistic algorithms that allow her to take accepted proto-Algonquian words in order to recreate an authentic Mohegan vocabulary.

In 2006, Fielding published A Modern Mohegan Dictionary. She also created the online Mohegan Language Project, a central part of her efforts to keep her ancestral language alive. Of this project, Fielding states that "the goal is fluency," and offers links to a Mohegan-English dictionary, phrase book, pronunciation guide, exercises, and an audio option. In an interview with the New York Times, Fielding said "In order for a language to survive and resurrect, it needs people talking it, and for people to talk it, there has to be a society that works on it."

She has worked "as a teacher, writer, editor, graphic artist and radio announcer. She has also served on the board of directors of educational institutions, media outlets, non-profit organizations, and religious organizations." She often translates English into Mohegan for speakers at Mohegan traditional ceremonies.

References

External links
MIT Linguistics Department Interview with Fielding
Photo of Stephanie Fielding

Living people
Native American linguists
Mohegan people
MIT School of Humanities, Arts, and Social Sciences alumni
University of Connecticut alumni
Native American writers
Native American language revitalization
Language activists
Year of birth missing (living people)
Women linguists
Linguists from the United States
21st-century linguists
Native American people from Connecticut
21st-century Native Americans
20th-century Native American women
20th-century Native Americans
21st-century Native American women
Writers from Connecticut
20th-century American women writers
21st-century American women writers